Demeter is a surname. Notable people with the surname include:

Christine Demeter (died 1973), murder victim
Dimitrija Demeter (1811–1872), Croatian poet and playwright
Don Demeter, American baseball player
George Demeter, author of Demeter's Manual of Parliamentary Law and Procedure
Peter Demeter, Christine Demeter's husband, convicted in her death
Steve Demeter (1935–2013), American baseball player and scout